Winfried Scharlau (12 August 1940, in Berlin – 26 November 2020) was a German mathematician.

Biography
Scharlau received his doctorate in 1967 from the University of Bonn. His doctoral thesis Quadratische Formen und Galois-Cohomologie (Quadratic Forms and Galois Cohomology) was supervised by Friedrich Hirzebruch. Scharlau was at the Institute for Advanced Study for the academic year 1969–1970 and in spring 1972. From 1970 he was a professor (most recently Institutsdirektor) at the University of Münster, where he has now retired.

Scharlau's research deals with number theory and, in particular, the theory of quadratic forms, about which he wrote a 1985 monograph Quadratic and Hermitian Forms in Springer's series Grundlehren der mathematischen Wissenschaften.

Scharlau was also an amateur ornithologist and author of two novels, I megali istoria - die große Geschichte (2nd edition 2001), set on the Greek island of Naxos, and  Scharife  (2001), set on the island of Zanzibar in the 19th century. He also deals with the history of mathematics and wrote, with Hans Opolka, a historically-oriented introduction to number theory. Their book presents, among other topics, the analytical class number formula of Dirichlet and the geometry of the numbers in the 19th century. Scharlau wrote a multi-part biography of Alexander Grothendieck.

Scharlau was a corresponding member of the Göttingen Academy of Sciences and Humanities. From 1991 to 1992 he was president of the German Mathematical Society. In 1974 he was invited speaker with talk On subspaces of inner product spaces at the International Congress of Mathematicians in Vancouver.

He was the father of the cognitive psychologist Ingrid Scharlau.

Selected publications
 with Friedrich Hirzebruch: Einführung in die Funktionalanalysis, BI, Mannheim 1971, Hirzebruch Collection (PDF)
 
 with H.-G. Quebbemann and Manfred Schultz: Quadratic and Hermitian forms in additive and abelian categories, Journal of Algebra vol. 59, no. 2, 264-289 1979
 with Manfred Knebusch: Algebraic theory of quadratic forms: generic methods and Pfister forms, vol. 1. Birkhäuser, 1980 (DMV Seminary, notes taken by Heisook Lee)
 with Hans Opolka: Von Fermat bis Minkowski. Eine Vorlesung über die Zahlentheorie und ihre Entwicklung. Springer, Berlin 1980
 Richard Dedekind 1831/1981. Vieweg, Braunschweig [et alia loca] 1981
 Quadratic and Hermitian Forms. Grundlehren der Mathematischen Wissenschaften 270. Springer, Berlin [et alia loca] 1985
 Mathematische Institute in Deutschland 1800–1945. Dokumente zur Geschichte der Mathematik. Vieweg, Braunschweig [et alia loca] 1990
 Schulwissen Mathematik. Ein Überblick. Vieweg, Braunschweig [et alia loca] 1994
 Beiträge zur Vogelwelt der südlichen Ägäis. Verlag C. Lienau, 1999
 
 Mathematik für Naturwissenschaftler. LIT Verlag, Münster 2005

References

External links
 
 website at the University of Münster
 https://www.trauer.ms/traueranzeige/winfried-scharlau-2020-11-26-havixbeck-9312841

1940 births
2020 deaths
Algebraists
20th-century German mathematicians
21st-century German mathematicians
University of Bonn alumni
Academic staff of the University of Münster